Jules Albert Wijdenbosch (born 2 May 1941 in Paramaribo) is a Surinamese politician who was President of Suriname from 1996 to 2000. He was a member of the National Democratic Party, which held absolute power in Suriname during the 1980s. He was Prime Minister from April 1987 until January 1988, Vice President from January 1991 until September 1991, and President from September 1996 until August 2000. He is now the leader of Democratic National Platform 2000. The Jules Wijdenbosch Bridge, which connects the East of the country with Paramaribo, has been named after Wijdenbosch.

References

1941 births
Living people
People from Paramaribo
Presidents of Suriname
Vice presidents of Suriname
Finance ministers of Suriname
National Democratic Party (Suriname) politicians
Prime Ministers of Suriname
Democratic National Platform 2000 politicians